Herbert Lenford Marshall (born August 20, 1949) is a retired gridiron football player who played for the Ottawa Rough Riders in the Canadian Football League, as well as the Detroit Wheels and Memphis Southmen in the World Football League.

Marshall was born in Corpus Christi, Texas, where he attended Roy Miller High School. He then played college football at Cameron University, and was drafted in the 14th round (363rd overall) of the 1973 NFL Draft by the Washington Redskins.

References

1949 births
Living people
People from Corpus Christi, Texas
Cameron Aggies football players
Ottawa Rough Riders players
Detroit Wheels players
Memphis Southmen players